Trail's End is a brand of Kentucky Straight Bourbon Whiskey that is aged eight years or ten year, and then finished with Oregon oak. It is distributed exclusively by Hood River Distillers, located in Hood River, Oregon. Batch #1 was released in August 2015 and Batch #2 in April 2016. Trail’s End 10-Year Kentucky Straight was released in November 2021.

Process 
Trail's End is aged in new charred white oak barrels for eight years or ten years in Kentucky. According to their website, it travels from Kentucky to Oregon, following the path similar to the one that Lewis and Clark once blazed. It is made with a traditional mash bill of corn, malted barley and approximately 10% rye. Once in Oregon, it is steeped with Oregon oak, then perfected with glacier-fed spring water from Mount Hood and bottled at 90 proof. Trail's End is non-chill filtered.

Awards 
2016 San Francisco World Spirits Competition: Double Gold
2016 Ultimate Spirits Challenge: 95 Points, Extraordinary, Ultimate Recommendation
2016 The Spirits International Prestige (SIP) Awards: Gold Medal

References

See also
 Waterbury, Margarett. "WHISKEY REVIEW: TRAIL'S END BOURBON". The Whiskey Wash. Retrieved 23 August 2016.

Bourbon whiskey
Hood River, Oregon
Hood River County, Oregon